Boys' road race was part of the cycling at the 2010 Summer Youth Olympics program. It was held on 22 August 2010 at The Float at Marina Bay. All three boys from each country team raced in the event. This was not an official individual event and therefore medals were not given. However the performance of the athletes provided points towards the Combined Mixed Team event for cycling.

Only the first place cyclist of each team provided points for the Combined Mixed Team event.  However, as an incentive for all three boys to finish the race the team was given a -5 reduction and an extra -10 reduction should they have 2 cyclists in the top 16 overall.

Results 
The race began at approximately 11:30 a.m. (UTC+8) on 22 August at The Float at Marina Bay.

References 

 Results

Cycling at the 2010 Summer Youth Olympics
2010 in road cycling